The arrondissement of Digne-les-Bains is an arrondissement of France in the Alpes-de-Haute-Provence department in the Provence-Alpes-Côte d'Azur region. It has had 46 communes.

Composition

The communes of the arrondissement of Digne-les-Bains, and their INSEE codes, are:

 Aiglun (04001)
 Archail (04009)
 Auzet (04017)
 Barles (04020)
 Barras (04021)
 Beaujeu (04024)
 Beynes (04028)
 Bras-d'Asse (04031)
 Le Brusquet (04036)
 Le Castellard-Mélan (04040)
 Le Chaffaut-Saint-Jurson (04046)
 Champtercier (04047)
 Château-Arnoux-Saint-Auban (04049)
 Châteauredon (04054)
 Digne-les-Bains (04070)
 Draix (04072)
 Entrages (04074)
 L'Escale (04079)
 Estoublon (04084)
 Ganagobie (04091)
 Hautes-Duyes (04177)
 La Javie (04097)
 Majastres (04107)
 Malijai (04108)
 Mallefougasse-Augès (04109)
 Mallemoisson (04110)
 Marcoux (04113)
 Les Mées (04116)
 Mézel (04121)
 Mirabeau (04122)
 Montclar (04126)
 Moustiers-Sainte-Marie (04135)
 Peyruis (04149)
 Prads-Haute-Bléone (04155)
 La Robine-sur-Galabre (04167)
 Sainte-Croix-du-Verdon (04176)
 Saint-Jeannet (04181)
 Saint-Julien-d'Asse (04182)
 Saint-Jurs (04184)
 Saint-Martin-lès-Seyne (04191)
 Selonnet (04203)
 Seyne (04205)
 Thoard (04217)
 Verdaches (04235)
 Le Vernet (04237)
 Volonne (04244)

History

The arrondissement of Digne-les-Bains was created in 1800. At the January 2017 reorganization of the arrondissements of Alpes-de-Haute-Provence, it lost nine communes to the arrondissement of Castellane and 16 communes to the arrondissement of Forcalquier, and it gained six communes from the arrondissement of Forcalquier.

As a result of the reorganisation of the cantons of France which came into effect in 2015, the borders of the cantons are no longer related to the borders of the arrondissements. The cantons of the arrondissement of Digne-les-Bains were, as of January 2015:

 Barrême
 Digne-les-Bains-Est
 Digne-les-Bains-Ouest
 La Javie
 Les Mées
 Mézel
 Moustiers-Sainte-Marie
 Riez
 Seyne
 Valensole

References

Digne-les-Bains